Sectorul Ciocana is one of the five sectors in Chişinău, the capital of Moldova. The local administration is managed by a pretor appointed by the city administration. It governs over a portion of the city of Chişinău itself (the eastern part), the town of Vadul lui Vodă, and the communes of Bubuieci, Budeşti, Coloniţa, Cruzeşti and Tohatin. It is largely populated by Romanians (Moldovans).

Sectors of Chișinău